The 2011–12 Indiana Pacers season was the 45th season of the franchise and 36th season in the National Basketball Association (NBA). The Pacers finished the regular season with a 42–24 record and secured a spot in the 2012 NBA playoffs as the 3rd best team in the Eastern Conference. After eliminating the Orlando Magic in the First Round in five games, Indiana lost in the East Semifinals series against the eventual champion Miami Heat in six games.

In the offseason, the team drafted future multi-time Finals MVP Kawhi Leonard, who was later traded to the San Antonio Spurs.

Key dates
 June 23: The 2011 NBA draft took place at Prudential Center in Newark, New Jersey.
 December 26: The regular season started with a win against the Detroit Pistons.
 April 11: The Pacers secure a playoff spot with a win against the Cleveland Cavaliers.
 May 8: By eliminating the Orlando Magic in the first round of the 2012 NBA Playoffs, the Pacers win their first playoff series since 2005.

2011 NBA Draft

Roster

Pre-season
Due to the 2011 NBA lockout negotiations, the programmed pre-season schedule, along with the first two weeks of the regular season were scrapped, and a two-game pre-season was set for each team once the lockout concluded.

|- bgcolor="#ffbbbb"
| 1
| December 16
| Chicago
| 
| Tyler Hansbrough (19)
| Tyler Hansbrough (11)
| Darren Collison (4)
| Conseco Fieldhouse14,013
| 0–1
|- bgcolor="#ffbbbb"
| 2
| December 21
| @ Chicago
| 
| Tyler Hansbrough (24)
| Tyler Hansbrough (13)
| Darren Collison (5)
| United Center21,659
| 0–2

Regular season

Standings

Record vs. opponents

Game log

|- bgcolor="#ccffcc"
| 1
| December 26
| Detroit
| 
| Danny Granger,Roy Hibbert (16)
| Roy Hibbert (14)
| Darren Collison (5)
| Bankers Life Fieldhouse18,165
| 1–0
|- bgcolor="#ccffcc"
| 2
| December 28
| @ Toronto
| 
| Danny Granger (21)
| Roy Hibbert (10)
| Darren Collison (12)
| Air Canada Centre19,800
| 2–0
|- bgcolor="#ccffcc"
| 3
| December 30
| Cleveland
| 
| Danny Granger (22)
| Roy Hibbert (13)
| Danny Granger,Darren Collison (4)
| Bankers Life Fieldhouse13,004
| 3–0
|- bgcolor=#ffcccc
| 4
| December 31
| @ Detroit
| 
| George Hill,Tyler Hansbrough (16)
| Five players (5)
| Darren Collison (8)
| The Palace of Auburn Hills8,824
| 3–1

|- bgcolor=#ccffcc
| 5
| January 2
| @ New Jersey
| 
| Paul George (21)
| Tyler Hansbrough (7)
| Darren Collison (7)
| Prudential Center12,519
| 4–1
|- bgcolor=#ffcccc
| 6
| January 4
| @ Miami
| 
| Roy Hibbert (16)
| Roy Hibbert (12)
| Paul George (3)
| American Airlines Arena20,201
| 4–2
|- bgcolor=#ccffcc
| 7
| January 6
| @ Boston
| 
| Danny Granger (15)
| Roy Hibbert (12)
| Darren Collison (4)
| TD Garden18,624
| 5–2
|- bgcolor=#ccffcc
| 8
| January 7
| Charlotte
| 
| Roy Hibbert (20)
| Darren Collison,Roy Hibbert (8)
| Darren Collison (4)
| Bankers Life Fieldhouse17,226
| 6–2
|- bgcolor=#ffcccc
| 9
| January 9
| @ Philadelphia
| 
| Roy Hibbert (19)
| David West (11)
| Paul George (5)
| Wells Fargo Center8,612
| 6–3
|- bgcolor=#ccffcc
| 10
| January 11
| Atlanta
| 
| Danny Granger (24)
| Roy Hibbert (11)
| Darren Collison (6)
| Bankers Life Fieldhouse10,334
| 7–3
|- bgcolor=#ccffcc
| 11
| January 13
| @ Toronto
| 
| George Hill (22)
| Roy Hibbert (9)
| Darren Collison (5)
| Air Canada Centre15,302
| 8–3
|- bgcolor=#ccffcc
| 12
| January 14
| Boston
| 
| Danny Granger (21)
| Roy Hibbert (9)
| Darren Collison (4)
| Bankers Life Fieldhouse14,203
| 9–3
|- bgcolor=#ffcccc
| 13
| January 18
| @ Sacramento
| 
| Darren Collison,Danny Granger (16)
| Paul George (9)
| Roy Hibbert (4)
| Power Balance Pavilion14,170
| 9–4
|- bgcolor=#ccffcc
| 14
| January 20
| @ Golden State
| 
| Danny Granger (26)
| Roy Hibbert (16)
| Darren Collison (9)
| Oracle Arena17,621
| 10–4
|- bgcolor=#ccffcc
| 15
| January 22
| @ L. A. Lakers
| 
| Roy Hibbert (18)
| David West (9)
| Darren Collison (7)
| Staples Center18,997
| 11–4
|- bgcolor=#ffcccc
| 16
| January 24
| Orlando
| 
| Danny Granger,Roy Hibbert (16)
| Roy Hibbert (12)
| Danny Granger,Roy Hibbert (3)
| Bankers Life Fieldhouse12,760
| 11–5
|- bgcolor=#ccffcc
| 17
| January 25
| @ Chicago
| 
| Danny Granger (22)
| Danny Granger (9)
| Darren Collison (8)
| United Center21,755
| 12–5
|- bgcolor=#ffcccc
| 18
| January 27
| @ Boston
| 
| Danny Granger (21)
| Paul George (9)
| Darren Collison (4)
| TD Garden18,624
| 12–6
|- bgcolor=#ccffcc
| 19
| January 29
| @ Orlando
| 
| Danny Granger (24)
| David West,Paul George (7)
| Darren Collison (10)
| Amway Center18,846
| 13–6
|- bgcolor=#ccffcc
| 20
| January 31
| New Jersey
| 
| Paul George (24)
| Roy Hibbert (14)
| Danny Granger,Lance Stephenson (5)
| Bankers Life Fieldhouse11,408
| 14–6

|- bgcolor="#ccffcc"
| 21
| February 1
| @ Minnesota
| 
| Danny Granger (36)
| Roy Hibbert (9)
| Darren Collison (9)
| Target Center15,017
| 15–6
|- bgcolor="#ccffcc"
| 22
| February 3
| @ Dallas
| 
| Paul George (30)
| Roy Hibbert (14)
| Darren Collison (6)
| American Airlines Center20,146
| 16–6
|- bgcolor="#ffcccc"
| 23
| February 4
| Orlando
| 
| Danny Granger (19)
| David West,Danny Granger (7)
| Paul George (5)
| Bankers Life Fieldhouse18,165
| 16–7
|- bgcolor="#ccffcc"
| 24
| February 7
| Utah
| 
| Darren Collison (25)
| Roy Hibbert (10)
| Darren Collison (5)
| Bankers Life Fieldhouse11,006
| 17–7
|- bgcolor=#ffcccc
| 25
| February 8
| @ Atlanta
| 
| Josh Smith (28)
| Roy Hibbert (13)
| Darren Collison (9)
| Philips Arena16,288
| 17–8
|- bgcolor=#ffcccc
| 26
| February 10
| @ Memphis
| 
| David West (22)
| David West (13)
| Mike Conley (6)
| FedEx Forum16,281
| 17–9
|- bgcolor=#ffcccc
| 27
| February 11
| Denver
| 
| Ty Lawson (27)
| David West (7)
| Darren Collison (7)
| Bankers Life Fieldhouse15,313
| 17–10
|- bgcolor=#ffcccc
| 28
| February 14
| Miami
| 
| LeBron James (23)
| LeBron James (9)
| LeBron James (7)
| Bankers Life Fieldhouse18,165
| 17–11
|- bgcolor=#ffcccc
| 29
| February 15
| @ Cleveland
| 
| Kyrie Irving (22)
| David West (10)
| Kyrie Irving (5)
| Quicken Loans Arena12,712
| 17–12
|- bgcolor=#ccffcc
| 30
| February 16
| New Jersey
| 
| Danny Granger (32)
| Roy Hibbert (11)
| Paul George (5)
| Bankers Life Fieldhouse11,117
| 18–12
|- bgcolor=#ccffcc
| 31
| February 19
| Charlotte
| 
| Roy Hibbert (18)
| Roy Hibbert (14)
| Darren Collison (6)
| Bankers Life Fieldhouse11,673
| 19–12
|- bgcolor=#ccffcc
| 32
| February 21
| New Orleans
| 
| Roy Hibbert (30)
| Roy Hibbert (13)
| Jarrett Jack (10)
| Bankers Life Fieldhouse10,508
| 20–12
|- bgcolor=#ccffcc
| 33
| February 22
| @ Charlotte
| 
| Tyler Hansbrough (22)
| Louis Amundson (12)
| Boris Diaw (8)
| Time Warner Cable Arena13,458
| 21–12
|- bgcolor=#ccffcc
| 34
| February 28
| Golden State
| 
| Danny Granger (25)
| Roy Hibbert (9)
| Darren Collison (5)
| Bankers Life Fieldhouse12,111
| 22–12

|- bgcolor=#ccffcc
| 35
| March 3
| @ New Orleans
| 
| Danny Granger (20)
| David West (13)
| Darren Collison (4)
| New Orleans Arena16,379
| 23–12
|- bgcolor=#ffcccc
| 36
| March 5
| @ Chicago
| 
| Paul George (21)
| David West (9)
| Roy Hibbert (4)
| United Center22,106
| 23–13
|- bgcolor=#ffcccc
| 37
| March 6
| Atlanta
| 
| David West (24)
| Danny GrangerRoy Hibbert (8)
| Darren Collison (4)
| Bankers Life Fieldhouse11,393
| 23–14
|- bgcolor=#ffcccc
| 38
| March 10
| @ Miami
| 
| Danny Granger (19)
| David West (10)
| Darren Collison (6)
| American Airlines Arena20,154
| 23–15
|- bgcolor=#ffcccc
| 39
| March 11
| @ Orlando
| 
| Paul George (22)
| Paul George (8)
| Darren Collison (4)
| Amway Center18,846
| 23–16
|- bgcolor=#ccffcc
| 40
| March 13
| Portland
| 
| Louis Amundson (21)
| David West (10)
| A. J. Price (6)
| Bankers Life Fieldhouse10,933
| 24–16
|- bgcolor=#ccffcc
| 41
| March 14
| Philadelphia
| 
| Danny Granger (20)
| Roy Hibbert (9)
| Roy Hibbert (5)
| Bankers Life Fieldhouse13,081
| 25–16
|- bgcolor=#ffcccc
| 42
| March 16
| @ New York
| 
| Darren Collison (15)
| Paul GeorgeTyler Hansbrough (6)
| Darren CollisonGeorge Hill (4)
| Madison Square Garden19,763
| 25–17
|- bgcolor=#ffcccc
| 43
| March 17
| New York
| 
| Roy Hibbert (24)
| Roy Hibbert (12)
| Paul George (4)
| Bankers Life Fieldhouse18,165
| 25–18
|- bgcolor=#ccffcc
| 44
| March 20
| L. A. Clippers
| 
| Danny Granger (25)
| Danny Granger (8)
| George Hill (6)
| Bankers Life Fieldhouse14,901
| 26–18
|- bgcolor=#ccffcc
| 45
| March 22
| @ Washington
| 
| Roy Hibbert (19)
| Roy Hibbert (9)
| Darren Collison (5)
| Verizon Center15,874
| 27–18
|- bgcolor=#ffcccc
| 46
| March 23
| Phoenix
| 
| Danny Granger (28)
| David West (8)
| Darren Collison (7)
| Bankers Life Fieldhouse14,786
| 27–19
|- bgcolor=#ccffcc
| 47
| March 24
| @ Milwaukee
| 
| George Hill (24)
| Roy Hibbert (9)
| George Hill (5)
| Bradley Center16,207
| 28–19
|- bgcolor=#ccffcc
| 48
| March 26
| Miami
| 
| Danny Granger (25)
| David West (12)
| David West (4)
| Bankers Life Fieldhouse17,415
| 29–19
|- bgcolor=#ffcccc
| 49
| March 28
| @ New Jersey
| 
| Paul George (22)
| Roy Hibbert (7)
| Darren Collison (7)
| Prudential Center10,817
| 29–20
|- bgcolor=#ccffcc
| 50
| March 29
| Washington
| 
| Danny Granger (25)
| David West (8)
| Darren Collison (7)
| Bankers Life Fieldhouse11,505
| 30–20
|- bgcolor=#ffcccc
| 51
| March 31
| @ San Antonio
| 
| Danny GrangerPaul George (18)
| Roy HibbertGeorge Hill (7)
| George Hill (6)
| AT&T Center18,581
| 30–21

|- bgcolor=#ccffcc
| 52
| April 1
| @ Houston
| 
| Danny Granger (32)
| Tyler Hansbrough (10)
| Darren Collison (7)
| Toyota Center18,197
| 31–21
|- bgcolor=#ccffcc
| 53
| April 3
| New York
| 
| Danny Granger (27)
| Paul George (8)
| George Hill (6)
| Bankers Life Fieldhouse17,042
| 32–21
|- bgcolor=#ccffcc
| 54
| April 4
| @ Washington
| 
| Danny Granger (20)
| Louis Amundson (8)
| Darren Collison (11)
| Verizon Center14,561
| 33–21
|- bgcolor=#ccffcc
| 55
| April 6
| Oklahoma City
| 
| Danny Granger (26)
| Paul George (16)
| George Hill (4)
| Bankers Life Fieldhouse18,165
| 34–21
|- bgcolor=#ffcccc
| 56
| April 7
| Boston
| 
| Danny Granger (20)
| Roy Hibbert (17)
| Darren CollisonPaul George (3)
| Bankers Life Fieldhouse16,892
| 34–22
|- bgcolor=#ccffcc
| 57
| April 9
| Toronto
| 
| Danny GrangerGeorge Hill (18)
| George HillTyler Hansbrough (7)
| George HillA. J. Price (4)
| Bankers Life Fieldhouse11,021
| 35–22
|- bgcolor=#ccffcc
| 58
| April 11
| @ Cleveland
| 
| Danny Granger (23)
| Roy Hibbert (11)
| Roy HibbertPaul George (5)
| Quicken Loans Arena14,307
| 36–22
|- bgcolor=#ccffcc
| 59
| April 13
| Cleveland
| 
| Danny Granger (18)
| Roy Hibbert (10)
| George Hill (7)
| Bankers Life Fieldhouse13,356
| 37–22
|- bgcolor=#ccffcc
| 60
| April 14
| @ Milwaukee
| 
| Roy Hibbert (23)
| Roy Hibbert (14)
| Danny GrangerGeorge Hill (3)
| Bradley Center15,143
| 38–22
|- bgcolor=#ccffcc
| 61
| April 16
| Minnesota
| 
| David West (22)
| Roy Hibbert (11)
| Danny Granger (5)
| Bankers Life Fieldhouse11,845
| 39–22
|- bgcolor=#ccffcc
| 62
| April 17
| @ Philadelphia
| 
| Danny Granger (24)
| Roy Hibbert (13)
| George Hill (7)
| Wells Fargo Center18,969
| 40–22
|- bgcolor=#ccffcc
| 63
| April 19
| Milwaukee
| 
| Danny Granger (29)
| David West (14)
| George Hill (8)
| Bankers Life Fieldhouse12,453
| 41–22
|- bgcolor=#ffcccc
| 64
| April 21
| Philadelphia
| 
| David West (32)
| David West (12)
| George Hill (5)
| Bankers Life Fieldhouse17,701
| 41–23
|- bgcolor=#ccffcc
| 65
| April 23
| Detroit
| 
| Paul George (27)
| Paul George (10)
| A.J. Price (6)
| Bankers Life Fieldhouse13,584
| 42–23
|- bgcolor=#ffcccc
| 66
| April 25
| Chicago
| 
| Lance Stephenson (22)
| Louis Amundson (7)
| George Hill (5)
| Bankers Life Fieldhouse18,165
| 42–24

Playoffs

Game log

|- bgcolor=#ffcccc
| 1
| April 28
| Orlando
| 
| David West (19)
| Roy Hibbert (13)
| Darren Collison (5)
| Bankers Life Fieldhouse18,165
| 0–1
|- bgcolor="#ccffcc"
| 2
| April 30
| Orlando
| 
| David WestDanny GrangerGeorge Hill (18)
| Roy Hibbert (13)
| David West (4)
| Bankers Life Fieldhouse18,165
| 1–1
|- bgcolor="#ccffcc"
| 3
| May 2
| @ Orlando
| 
| Danny Granger (26)
| Roy Hibbert (10)
| Paul George (4)
| Amway Center18,846
| 2–1
|- bgcolor="#ccffcc"
| 4
| May 5
| @ Orlando
| 
| David West (26)
| David West (12)
| Darren Collison (9)
| Amway Center18,846
| 3–1
|- bgcolor="#ccffcc"
| 5
| May 8
| Orlando
| 
| Danny Granger (25)
| David West (8)
| Darren Collison (6)
| Bankers Life Fieldhouse18,165
| 4–1
|-

|- bgcolor=#ffcccc
| 1
| May 13
| @ Miami
| 
| David WestRoy Hibbert (17)
| David West (12)
| Darren Collison (6)
| American Airlines Arena19,600
| 0–1
|- bgcolor="#ccffcc"
| 2
| May 15
| @ Miami
| 
| David West (16)
| Roy HibbertPaul George (11)
| Danny Granger (3)
| American Airlines Arena19,828
| 1–1
|- bgcolor="#ccffcc"
| 3
| May 17
| Miami
| 
| George Hill (20)
| Roy Hibbert (18)
| George Hill (5)
| Bankers Life Fieldhouse18,165
| 2–1
|- bgcolor=#ffcccc
| 4
| May 20
| Miami
| 
| Danny Granger (20)
| Roy Hibbert (9)
| Paul George (5)
| Bankers Life Fieldhouse18,165
| 2–2
|- bgcolor=#ffcccc
| 5
| May 22
| @ Miami
| 
| Paul George (11)
| Roy Hibbert (12)
| Paul George (3)
| American Airlines Arena20,097
| 2–3
|- bgcolor=#ffcccc
| 6
| May 24
| Miami
| 
| David West (24)
| Paul George (10)
| George Hill (5)
| Bankers Life Fieldhouse18,165
| 2–4

Player statistics

Regular season

|- align="center" bgcolor=""
| 
| 60 || 0 || 12.6 || .430 ||  || .427 || 3.7 || .2 || .5 || .7 || 3.6
|- align="center" bgcolor="#f0f0f0"
| 
| 22 || 0 || 19.8 || .399 || .424 || .758 || 2.2 || 1.5 || .9 || .0 || 8.9
|- align="center" bgcolor=""
| 
| 60 || 56 || 31.3 || .440 || .362 || .830 || 3.1 ||style="background:#FFC322;color:#092C57;" |4.8 || .8 || .2 || 10.4
|- align="center" bgcolor="#f0f0f0"
| 
| 3 || 0 || 5.7 || .400 ||  || .667 || 3.0 || .3 || .7 || .0 || 2.7
|- align="center" bgcolor=""
| 
| 11 || 0 || 12.8 ||style="background:#FFC322;color:#092C57;" |.500 ||style="background:#FFC322;color:#092C57;" |1.000 || .667 || 3.8 || .4 || .7 || .1 || 2.3
|- align="center" bgcolor="#f0f0f0"
| 
|style="background:#FFC322;color:#092C57;" |66 ||style="background:#FFC322;color:#092C57;" |66 || 29.7 || .440 || .385 || .802 || 5.6 || 2.4 ||style="background:#FFC322;color:#092C57;" |1.6 || .6 || 12.1
|- align="center" bgcolor=""
| 
| 62 || 62 ||style="background:#FFC322;color:#092C57;" |33.3 || .416 || .381 ||style="background:#FFC322;color:#092C57;" |.873 || 5.0 || 1.8 || 1.0 || .6 ||style="background:#FFC322;color:#092C57;" |18.7
|- align="center" bgcolor="#f0f0f0"
| 
|style="background:#FFC322;color:#092C57;" |66 || 0 || 21.8 || .405 || .000 || .813 || 4.4 || .5 || .8 || .1 || 9.3
|- align="center" bgcolor=""
| 
| 65 || 65 || 29.8 || .497 || .000 || .711 ||style="background:#FFC322;color:#092C57;" |8.8 || 1.7 || .5 ||style="background:#FFC322;color:#092C57;" |2.0 || 12.8
|- align="center" bgcolor="#f0f0f0"
| 
| 50 || 9 || 25.5 || .442 || .367 || .778 || 3.0 || 2.9 || .8 || .3 || 9.6
|- align="center" bgcolor=""
| 
| 65 || 3 || 16.2 || .409 || .429 || .838 || 1.8 || 1.0 || .4 || .2 || 5.3
|- align="center" bgcolor="#f0f0f0"
| 
| 20 || 1 || 5.3 || .417 ||  || .571 || 1.7 || .2 || .2 || .1 || 1.7
|- align="center" bgcolor=""
| 
| 44 || 1 || 12.9 || .339 || .295 || .800 || 1.4 || 2.0 || .5 || .0 || 3.9
|- align="center" bgcolor="#f0f0f0"
| 
| 42 || 1 || 10.5 || .376 || .133 || .471 || 1.3 || 1.1 || .5 || .1 || 2.5
|- align="center" bgcolor=""
| 
|style="background:#FFC322;color:#092C57;" |66 ||style="background:#FFC322;color:#092C57;" |66 || 29.2 || .487 || .222 || .807 || 6.6 || 2.1 || .8 || .7 || 12.8
|}

Playoffs

|- align="center" bgcolor=""
| 
| 11 || 0 || 8.5 ||style="background:#FFC322;color:#092C57;" |.522 ||  || .500 || 2.1 || .2 || .2 || .5 || 2.5
|- align="center" bgcolor="#f0f0f0"
| 
| 11 || 0 || 20.3 || .370 || .150 || .500 || 2.2 || 1.3 || .5 || .1 || 5.7
|- align="center" bgcolor=""
| 
| 11 || 0 || 18.6 || .514 || .364 || .870 || 1.3 ||style="background:#FFC322;color:#092C57;" |3.0 || 1.3 || .0 || 8.7
|- align="center" bgcolor="#f0f0f0"
| 
| 11 || 11 || 33.7 || .389 || .268 || .786 || 6.6 || 2.4 ||style="background:#FFC322;color:#092C57;" |1.6 || .4 || 9.7
|- align="center" bgcolor=""
| 
| 11 || 11 ||style="background:#FFC322;color:#092C57;" |38.2 || .397 || .356 || .821 || 5.6 || 2.5 || .6 || .4 ||style="background:#FFC322;color:#092C57;" |17.0
|- align="center" bgcolor="#f0f0f0"
| 
| 11 || 0 || 14.9 || .340 ||  || .667 || 3.2 || .5 || .5 || .5 || 4.4
|- align="center" bgcolor=""
| 
| 11 || 11 || 30.9 || .500 ||style="background:#FFC322;color:#092C57;" |1.000 || .667 ||style="background:#FFC322;color:#092C57;" |11.2 || 1.1 || .4 ||style="background:#FFC322;color:#092C57;" |3.1 || 11.7
|- align="center" bgcolor="#f0f0f0"
| 
| 11 || 11 || 31.5 || .448 || .375 || .848 || 2.3 || 2.9 || 1.2 || .3 || 13.5
|- align="center" bgcolor=""
| 
| 7 || 0 || 8.3 || .222 || .222 ||style="background:#FFC322;color:#092C57;" |1.000 || 1.0 || .4 || .4 || .1 || 2.4
|- align="center" bgcolor="#f0f0f0"
| 
| 4 || 0 || 2.3 || .333 ||  ||  || .5 || .0 || .0 || .0 || .5
|- align="center" bgcolor=""
| 
| 4 || 0 || 1.8 || .500 ||  ||  || .5 || .3 || .0 || .0 || .5
|- align="center" bgcolor="#f0f0f0"
| 
| 4 || 0 || 3.0 || .222 || .500 || .500 || .0 || .3 || .0 || .0 || 1.5
|- align="center" bgcolor=""
| 
| 11 || 11 || 37.8 || .446 ||  || .818 || 8.5 || 2.0 || .7 || .5 || 15.3
|}

Awards
 Head coach Frank Vogel was named Eastern Conference Coach of the Month for April.
 Team president Larry Bird won the NBA Executive of the Year Award, becoming the first person in NBA history to also win the Most Valuable Player and Coach of the Year awards.

All-Star
 Roy Hibbert made his first All-Star appearance at the 2012 NBA All-Star Game.
 Paul George was selected to play in the BBVA Rising Stars Challenge and also participated in the Slam Dunk Contest.

Disciplinary actions
 Danny Granger and David West received a $25,000 fine after an altercation during a game against the Milwaukee Bucks on April 19.
 Head coach Frank Vogel was fined $15,000 before the playoff series against the Miami Heat began, after making comments about the officiating.

Transactions

Overview

Trades

Free agents

Many players signed with teams from other leagues due to the 2011 NBA lockout. FIBA allows players under NBA contracts to sign and play for teams from other leagues if the contracts have opt-out clauses that allow the players to return to the NBA if the lockout ends. The Chinese Basketball Association, however, only allows its clubs to sign foreign free agents who could play for at least the entire season.

See also
2011–12 NBA season

References

Indiana Pacers seasons
Indiana Pacers
Pace
Pace